Hukani, also known as Hukani-ye Sabzeh, may refer to:
Hukani-ye Olya
Hukani-ye Sofla